Fion is a small town and commune in the Cercle of San in the Ségou Region of Mali. In 1998 the commune had a population of 5,686.

References

Communes of Ségou Region